The initiator element (Inr), sometimes referred to as initiator motif, is a core promoter that is similar in function to the Pribnow box (in prokaryotes) or the TATA box (in eukaryotes). The Inr is the simplest functional promoter that is able to direct transcription initiation without a functional TATA box. It has the consensus sequence YYANWYY in humans.  Similarly to the TATA box, the Inr element facilitates the binding of transcription Factor II D (TFIID). The Inr works by enhancing binding affinity and strengthening the promoter.

Overview
The initiator element (Inr) is the most common sequence found at the transcription start site of eukaryotic genes. It is a 17 bp element. Inr in humans was first explained and sequenced by two MIT biologists, Stephen T. Smale and David Baltimore in 1989. Their research showed that Inr promoter is able to initiate basal transcription in absence of the TATA box.  In the presence of a TATA box or other promoters, the Inr increases the efficiency of transcription by working alongside the promoters to bind RNA polymerase II. A gene with both types of promoters will have higher promoter binding strength, easier activation and higher levels of transcription activity. The TFIID, which is a component of the RNA polymerase II preinitiation complex binds to both the TATA box and Inr. Two subunits, TAF1 and TAF2, of the TFIID recognize the Inr sequence and bring the complex together. The interaction between TFIID and Inr is believed to be most imperative in initiating transcription. This is likey due to the Inr sequence overlapping the start site. The Inr element is also believed to interact with activator Sp1, specificity protein 1 transcription factor. Sp1 is then able to regulate the activation and initiation of transcription

Location
The Inr element sequence is located -6 bp upstream of the transcription start site and continues to around +45 bp downstream. This sequence encompasses where the RNA polymerase will begin transcribing. The Inr element is located about ~20 bp downstream from the TATA box. The Inr region overlaps the transcription start site but the exact start and end positions are still being debated.

Sequence
The consensus sequence of Inr in humans was inferred to be YYANWYY.  The consensus sequence in Drosophila is TCAKTY.

Evolutionary change
Studies have shown that promoters with a functional Inr are more likely to lack a TATA box or to possess a degenerate TATA sequence. This is because a gene with an active Inr is less dependent on a functional TATA box or additional promoters. Although Inr element varies between promoters, the sequence is highly conserved between humans and yeast. An analysis of 7670 transcription start sites showed that roughly 40% had an exact match to the BBCA+1BW Inr sequence. While 16% contained only one mismatch  TFIID and subunits are very sensitive to the Inr sequence and nucleotide changes have been shown to drastically change the binding affinity. The +1 and -3 positions have been identified as the most critical for transcription efficiency and Inr function. A replacement of the Adenosine  nucleotide at the +1 to G or T changes transcription activity by 10% and a replacement of Thymine at the +3 position changes transcription activity levels by 22%.

Significance
The Inr element for core promoters was found to be more prevalent than the TATA box in eukaryotic promoter domains. In a study of 1800+ distinct human promoter sequences it was found that 49% contain the Inr element while 21.8% contain the TATA box. Out of those sequences with the TATA box, 62% contained the Inr element as well. Though the Inr element is not fully understood it has been recognized as the most frequently occurring sequence at the start site of genes in multiple species. Further research can allow for more understanding of the elements that regulate gene production.

Notes
In nucleic acid notation for DNA, K stands for G/T (Keto)

References 

2. 

DNA
Regulatory sequences